Kabhi Kabhie (English: Sometimes) is a 1976 Indian musical romantic drama film produced and directed by Yash Chopra and written by Pamela Chopra starring an ensemble cast of Amitabh Bachchan, Raakhee, Shashi Kapoor, Waheeda Rehman, Rishi Kapoor and Neetu Singh. This was Yash Chopra's second directorial film with Amitabh Bachchan and Shashi Kapoor in the lead roles after Deewaar (1975) and was particularly noted for its soundtrack compositions by Khayyam, who won Best Music Director, while Sahir Ludhianvi won Best Lyricist for "Kabhi Kabhie Mere Dil Mein" at the 24th Filmfare Awards. The song also earned Mukesh the Filmfare Award for Best Male Playback Singer. Kabhi Kabhie received highly positive reviews from critics upon release and earned an estimated 40 million at the box office.

Plot 
Amit Malhotra (Amitabh Bachchan), an upcoming poet, recites one of his poems at his college, where he meets fellow student Pooja (Raakhee), and they fall in love. After Pooja's parents arrange for her to marry an architect, Vijay Khanna (Shashi Kapoor), without her consent, Amit and Pooja agree to end their relationship, however Pooja's final request of Amit is that he continue his poetry, to which he refuses. A heartbroken Amit returns home and takes over his father's quarry company, and marries Anjali (Waheeda Rehman). Amit and Anjali have a daughter, Sweety (Naseem), while Pooja and Vijay have a son, Vikram (Rishi Kapoor), also known as "Vicky".

Pooja becomes the host of a TV interview program, and one of her guests happens to be Amit, who has since become famous for the same anthology he gifted Pooja on her wedding night. When asked why he stopped writing poetry, Amit responds by talking about how his sorrow drove him away. Vijay sees Amit and Pooja afterwards, and he reveals he is a big fan of Amit's poetry. He correctly deduces that Amit's refusal to continue his writing was caused by heartbreak, and Amit angrily storms out.

Pooja and Vijay's son, Vicky falls in love with Pinky (Neetu Singh), the daughter of Vijay's friend and doctor, and the two plan to get married. Pinky learns of her adoption and it is revealed the identity of her real mother is none other than Anjali, Amit's wife. Pinky travels to Amit's household and tries to get close to Anjali. While Anjali eventually acknowledges her existence and secretly showers her love on her reunited daughter, she does not reveal the relationship to her husband, fearing for her marriage, instead posing Pinky as her niece from Delhi.

The situation is further complicated by Vicky's unexpected arrival in a bid to remain close to Pinky. The situation backfires when Sweety falls in love with Vicky. Seeing Sweety happy alongside Vicky, Anjali and Amit bring forward the idea of marriage between the two, causing Pinky to storm off angrily to the guest house in which Vicky is staying. Anjali watches as Pinky leaves Vicky's house and questions her, to which Pinky admits that Vicky is her fiancé.

Knowing that Vicky and Pinky are in love and already due to be married, Anjali goes to Amit in an attempt to dissuade him from marrying Vicky and Sweety. Amit responds by accusing Anjali of favoring Pinky over Sweety. Realizing that Pinky is not just her "niece", Amit demands to know who Pinky really is, forcing Anjali to reveal that Pinky is her illegitimate daughter. A shocked Amit becomes furious with both Anjali and Pinky.

Amit meets with an architect, who happens to be Vijay, Pooja's husband. As Amit stops by to pick Vijay and Pooja up for dinner, Pooja and Amit reflect on their past love for one another, which Vijay overhears, and realizes that Amit's mysterious aforementioned heartbreak was none other than his own wife, Pooja. An angry Vijay has a heart to heart conversation with Amit, and both come to terms with the past, which is witnessed by both Anjali and Pooja.

Anjali apologizes to Amit for hiding the truth for so long, but Amit angrily rebuffs her, and a hurt Anjali decides to leave Amit. Sweety overlooks an intimate moment between Pinky and Vicky, and still in love with Vicky and not realizing his engagement, she cries and has a fit, causing Amit to slap her and call her a spoiled brat.

Feeling abandoned by everyone, Sweety decides to commit suicide by riding her horse into one of the dynamite explosions in the quarry. Vicky chases after her on horseback, while Amit, Pinky, and Vijay follow close behind on vehicle. A spark from the explosion catches a pile of dry twigs, igniting a forest fire. Sweety dismounts and runs into the fire, followed by Vicky who attempts to dissuade her, revealing that him and Pinky are engaged, causing her to drop her anger.

Amit rescues Vicky and Sweety, while Vijay rescues Pinky, and they all embrace. After the near death experience, Amit realizes his mistake and that he was wrong, and races home to stop Anjali from leaving. He arrives just in time, and they both tearfully reconcile, admitting they do love each other. Amit and Pooja put the past behind them and become friends anew, while Pinky and Vicky get married.

Cast 
Amitabh Bachchan as Amitabh "Amit" Malhotra
 Raakhee as Pooja Khanna
 Shashi Kapoor as Vijay Khanna
 Waheeda Rehman as Anjali  "Anju" Malhotra
 Rishi Kapoor as Vikram “Vicky” Khanna
 Neetu Singh as Pinky Kapoor
 Naseem as Sweety Malhotra
 Simi Garewal as Shobha Kapoor
 Parikshit Sahni as Dr. R.P. Kapoor
Iftekhar as Mr. Malhotra
Deven Verma as Ram Bajaj

Production 
The film's concept came to Yash Chopra while he was reading a poem by his longtime friend (and also the film's lyricist) Sahir Ludhianvi. The movie was shot in Kashmir, and Yash Chopra has claimed this to be one of his happiest experiences and he described the production as a "honeymoon", since the entire cast worked together as a family. The film also led to the reinvention of Amitabh Bachchan as a romantic poet who loses his love, which was a major departure from his earlier "angry-young-man" roles such as Zanjeer (1973), Sholay (1975) and Deewaar (1975). The film had been written with Raakhee in mind, and she had agreed to do it during the making of Daag: A Poem of Love (1973) but before production started she married lyricist Gulzar, who wanted her to retire from acting. However, after some persuasion from Yash Chopra, Gulzar let her do the film.

Crew 
 Chief Assistant Director: Ramesh Talwar
 Art Direction: Desh Mukerji
 Costume Design: Jennifer Kapoor, Rajee Singh
 Choreography: Suresh Bhatt

Soundtrack 
The soundtrack was composed by Khayyam with lyrics by Sahir Ludhianvi, both of whom won Best Music and Best Lyricist at the 24th Filmfare Awards. The song Kabhi Kabhie Mere Dil Mein (Duet Version) sung by Mukesh and Lata Mangeshkar, topped the year end Annual list 1976 of Radio Ceylon radio show, Binaca Geetmala. The soundtrack was listed at #7 on Planet Bollywood's list of 100 Greatest Bollywood Soundtracks. Rakesh Budhu of Planet Bollywood gave 9.5 stars out of 10 stating, "Kabhi Kabhie will remain an ode to brilliant melody".

Awards 
24th Filmfare Awards:

Won

 Best Music Director – Khayyam
 Best Lyricist – Sahir Ludhianvi for "Kabhi Kabhie Mere Dil Mein"
 Best Male Playback Singer – Mukesh for "Kabhi Kabhie Mere Dil Mein"
 Best Dialogue – Sagar Sarhadi

Nominated

 Best Film – Yash Chopra
 Best Director – Yash Chopra
 Best Actor – Amitabh Bachchan
 Best Actress – Raakhee
 Best Supporting Actor – Shashi Kapoor
 Best Supporting Actress – Waheeda Rehman
 Best Lyricist – Sahir Ludhianvi for "Main Pal Do Pal Ka Shayar Hoon"
 Best Male Playback Singer – Mukesh for "Main Pal Do Pal Ka Shayar Hoon"
 Best Story – Pamela Chopra

Home media 
DVD
 The release date of the DVD for this film is 1 November 1999.
 DVD is available at Amazon
Blu-ray
 The release date of the Blu-ray is 2 March 2010
 Blu-ray is available at Amazon
Satellite Rights and VOD
 The film's satellite rights are with Sony TV while it is available as VOD on Amazon Prime Video

References

External links 
 
 Kabhi Kabhie at Yash Raj Films

1976 films
1970s Hindi-language films
1976 romantic drama films
Films directed by Yash Chopra
Films scored by Khayyam
Films set in Jammu and Kashmir
Films shot in Jammu and Kashmir
Indian romantic drama films
1970s Urdu-language films
Yash Raj Films films